Dream.9: Feather Weight Grand Prix 2009 Second Round was a mixed martial arts event  promoted by Fighting and Entertainment Group's mixed martial arts promotion Dream on May 26, 2009.  It featured the second round of the promotion's featherweight grand prix and saw the return of Norifumi Yamamoto, who was given a first round bye, as well as a middleweight title fight between Ronaldo Souza and Jason Miller.

Results

See also
 Dream (mixed martial arts)
 List of Dream champions
 2009 in DREAM

Notes
Norifumi "Kid" Yamamoto entered the second round of the grand prix after receiving a first round bye at Dream 7 due to recovering from reconstructive knee surgery.
Hideo Tokoro and Daiki Hata fought at Dream.8 after Hata was unable to fight at Dream 7.
 Tokoro replaced the injured Daiki Hata.
 Dream 9 was the first Dream event to air in prime time on Tokyo Broadcasting System since Dream 6 in September 2008. During the same time slot WBC Flyweight Champion Daisuke Naito defended his title against Xiong Zhao Zhong.
 Dream 9 aired live on North American based cable network HDNet at 5 am EST and again on tape delay later in the day.

References

Dream (mixed martial arts) events
2009 in mixed martial arts
Sport in Yokohama
Mixed martial arts in Japan
2009 in Japan